Bombay Dockyard or formally His Majesty's Indian Dockyard, Bombay was originally a naval facility developed by the East India Company beginning in 1670. It was formally established as a Royal Navy Dockyard in 1811 and base of the East Indies Station when the Department of Admiralty in London took over it. The yard was initially managed by the Navy Board through its Resident Commissioner, Bombay until 1832 when administration of the yard was taken over by the Board of Admiralty.

After the Independence of India the dockyard was taken over by the Indian Navy.

History
Britain's representation  in the East Indies was dominated by the English East India Company formed in 1600. The company created its own navy as early as 1613 and became known as the East India Marine and equipment for building ships at Bombay was sent directly from England. Beginning in 1670 Bombay began to be developed as a shipyard and by 1686 Bombay had become the headquarters of the English East India Company and its fleet in India was renamed the Bombay Marine. To support the Bombay Marine a refit yard was built with a supporting shore organisation consisting of a marine storekeeper, Mr. William Minchen, who was appointed in 1670 and a master shipbuilder Mr. Warwick Pett. The structure followed that of other Royal Navy Dockyards such as those in England where in the early 17th century the naval storekeeper and master shipwright were key posts. The development in the administrative structure was notable for the combination of shore and ship establishments. 

In 1735 by the East India Company, brought in shipwrights from their base at Surat in order to construct vessels using Malabar teak. One of their number, Lovji Nusserwanjee Wadia, was (along with several generations of his descendants) a key figure in the success of the Yard, as indicated in The New Cambridge History of India: Science, Technology and Medicine in Colonial India In 1742 a post of Superintendent of the Bombay Marine was created along with a  Commodore, Bombay Marine and seven other commanders. The superintendent controlled the dockyard with the commodore reporting to him, a purser of the marine being in charge of accounts, a master builder, and storekeeper in charge of their departments. Additionally in 1742 a Bombay Marine Board was established to administrate the dockyard consisting of the superintendent, the commodore and two senior captains as the facilities customers, and the superintendent’s deputy, the master attendant.

In the first decade of the 19th century the Department of Admiralty in London gradually took over responsibility for the yard, and day to administration of the yard passed from the superintendent to the Navy Boards, Resident Commissioner, Bombay, who continued working with the Wadia family as Master Shipwrights. There was much construction on the site around this time. Duncan Dock, which was the largest dry dock outside Europe at the time, was constructed in 1807–1810, and remains in use today. The main Dockyard building, which fronts onto Shahid Bhagat Singh Road, dates from 1807, as does the administration block. In 1832 the Navy Board was abolished and responsibility for the management of the yard passed to the Board of Admiralty. 

The nearby Great Western Building (formerly Admiralty House) had housed the Port Admiral from around 1764–1792.

Administration of the Dockyard

Superintendent Bombay Marine
Included:
 1794 to 1801, Captain, Philip Dundas.
 1802-1804, Captain, Robert Anderson.
 1805-1808, Captain, William Taylor Money. (remained superintendent until 1810).
 Post not recorded

Resident Commissioner, Bombay

Naval Storekeeper, Bombay
Included:
 1794, James Moseley. 
 1796-1801, Philip Dundas.
 1801-1807, Simon Halliday.
 1807-1808, De Souza
 1808-1810, William Taylor Money.
 1810-1811, Hamilton. 
 1811–1816, Charles Northcoate.

Master Shipwright, Bombay

Included:
 1670, Warwick Pett.
 1736–1774, Lovji Nusserwanjee Wadia.
 1774–1792, Maneckjee Lowjee Wadia and 1774–1790, Bomanjee Lowjee Wadia. (joint)
 1792–1804, Framjee Maneckjee Wadia and 1792–1821, Jamsetjee Bomanjee Wadia (joint)
 1821–1844, Nowrojee Jamsetjee Wadia.
 1844–1857, Gursetjee Rustomjee Wadia. 
 1857-1866, Jehangir Nowrojee Wadia.
 1866-1884, Jamsetjee Duhunjibhoy Wadia.

Assistant Master Shipwright, Bombay
 1821–1840, Ardaseer Cursetjee Wadia.

Master Builder, Bombay
 1814-1821 Joseph Seaton. (transferred from Deptford Dockyard).

Chief Inspector of Machinery, Bombay
 1841–1857, Ardaseer Cursetjee Wadia.

References

Bibliography
 Admiralty, Great Britain (1823). The Navy List. London: H.M. Stationery Office. 
 Arnold, David (2004), The New Cambridge History of India: Science, Technology and Medicine in Colonial India, Cambridge University Press, .
 Day, John Frederick. (April 2012) ' British Admiralty Control and Naval Power in the Indian Ocean (1793-1815) (Volume 1 of 2)'. Submitted as a thesis for the degree of Doctor of Philosophy in Maritime History, University of Exeter.
 Harrison, Simon (2010–2018). "Master Shipwright at Bombay Dockyard". threedecks.org. S. Harrison. Retrieved 3 September 2019.
 Low, Charles Rathbone (2012). History of the Indian Navy 1613-1863 Volume I. Luton, England.: Andrews UK Limited. .
 Wadia, Ruttonjee Ardeshir (1955). Bombay Dockyard And The Wadia Master Builders. Bombay, India: R. A. Wadia.

Royal Navy bases outside the United Kingdom